The Fires Prevention Act 1838 or the Fires Prevention (Metropolis) Act 1838 (1 & 2 Vict c 75) was an Act of the Parliament of the United Kingdom. It amended the provisions of the Fires Prevention Act 1785, which related to manufactories of tar, pitch and turpentine, by enacting that the penalty of £100 inflicted to the owners or occupiers of such buildings by that Act would only be applied when the building was within 75 feet of another building. If the adjacent building was occupied by the same tenant, and the whole premises were more than 75 feet from any other building, the penalty would not apply. It also established that no person would be liable for any penalties under that Act until January 1839, with proprietors or occupiers of such buildings remaining exempt until August 1840.

The whole Act, so far as unrepealed, was repealed by section 13(2) of, and Part II of Schedule 4 to, the Criminal Law Act 1967.

References
The Statutes of the United Kingdom of Great Britain and Ireland, 1 & 2 Victoriæ. 1838. Printed by Her Majesty's Printers. London. 1838. Pages 849 and 850. Digitised copy from Google Books.
The British almanac of the Society for the Diffusion of Useful Knowledge, for the year 1839. The Society for the Diffusion of Useful Knowledge, London, 1839.

United Kingdom Acts of Parliament 1838
Fire prevention law